The streaked barwing (Actinodura souliei) is a species of bird in the family Leiothrichidae.
It is found in China and Vietnam.
Its natural habitats are temperate forests and subtropical or tropical moist lowland forests.

References

Collar, N. J. & Robson C. 2007. Family Timaliidae (Babblers)  pp. 70 – 291 in; del Hoyo, J., Elliott, A. & Christie, D.A. eds. Handbook of the Birds of the World, Vol. 12. Picathartes to Tits and Chickadees. Lynx Edicions, Barcelona.

streaked barwing
Birds of Central China
Birds of Yunnan
Birds of Vietnam
streaked barwing
Taxonomy articles created by Polbot
Taxobox binomials not recognized by IUCN